The 2016 New York Yankees season was the 114th season for the New York Yankees.  Throughout the season, the Yankees wore a #8 patch on their left sleeve in memory of Hall of Famer Yogi Berra who died in September 2015. It was the final season for Alex Rodriguez and Mark Teixeira. For the third time in four years, the Yankees failed to make the playoffs, finishing in 4th place in the AL East with an 84–78 record. The 2016 season was notable in that it marked the first time since 1989 that the Yankees were sellers at the trade deadline, dealing away valuable pieces to gain minor league prospects for the future. Rookie catcher Gary Sánchez made headlines by hitting 20 home runs in his first 53 games, representing the Yankees youth movement known as the "Baby Bombers".

Offseason
On October 18, 2015 the Yankees fired their hitting coach, after just one season, Jeff Pentland.
On November 2, it was announced that Alan Cockrell who was hired as the assistant the season before; will assume the role as hitting coach, with Marcus Thames as his assistant.
On November 11, the Yankees traded John Ryan Murphy for Aaron Hicks.
On December 9, the Yankees traded Adam Warren and Brendan Ryan to the Chicago Cubs in exchange for Starlin Castro.
Also on December 9, the Yankees traded Justin Wilson to the Detroit Tigers for pitching prospects Luis Cessa and Chad Green. On December 28, the Yankees traded Eric Jagielo, Rookie Davis, Tony Renda, and Caleb Cotham for Aroldis Chapman from the Cincinnati Reds. 
On January 8, 2016, the Yankees purchased Kirby Yates from the Cleveland Indians. On January 17, the Yankees claimed Lane Adams off waivers, from the Kansas City Royals. On February 21, the Yankees signed free agent Chris Parmelee.
On April 4, the Yankees traded Carlos Corporán to the Tampa Bay Rays for cash considerations.

Season standings

American League East

American League Wild Card

Record vs. opponents

Roster

Season summary

April

After the Yankees opening day was rained out, the Yankees played it a day later on April 5, losing 3–5 to the Houston Astros.  The Yankees would go on to win their opening series two games to one against Houston. The next series, the Yankees went to Detroit to face the Detroit Tigers, taking one game and losing one game before having the final game postponed for an eventual make-up.  The Yankees would go on to lose their next three series against the Blue Jays, Mariners, and the Oakland Athletics (a series in which they were swept).  The Yankees would take two games in a three-game series against the Tampa Bay Rays at home.  They finished April poorly with four game losing streak against the Texas Rangers and rival Red Sox.  The Yankees finished April with a record of 8–14.

On April 12, Starlin Castro recorded his 1000th career hit. On April 20, Aaron Hicks recorded the fastest recorded throw tracked by Statcast in a 2–5 loss to Oakland, throwing out runner Danny Valencia at home plate. On April 22, Jacoby Ellsbury recorded a straight steal of home, the first such occurrence for the Yankees since Derek Jeter did so against the Baltimore Orioles on May 5, 2001. The next day, Brett Gardner hit a walk-off home run against the Rays.

May
May saw a better overall month for the Yankees. The month opened with a loss to the Red Sox and a losing series against the Baltimore Orioles as the Yankees' reached the lowest point of their season at 9-17, eight games below .500. After that, the Yankees won three straight home series against Boston, the Kansas City Royals and the Chicago White Sox. Then, they travelled to the west coast for interleague play, dropping two of three to the Arizona Diamondbacks, including the first game in the series, which was the major league debut for starting pitcher Chad Green, then sweeping a four-game series against the Athletics to end the road trip at 21-22.

The Yankees crawled back to .500 (22-22) by winning the first game in the series against Toronto. However, they would lose five of the next seven games against the Blue Jays and the Rays to end the month of May at 24-27. The Yankees finished May with a record of 16–13.

On May 9, closer Aroldis Chapman made his Yankees debut, pitching one inning and allowing one earned run on two hits. The vaunted bullpen trio of Dellin Betances, Andrew Miller and Chapman became known in the media as "No-Runs DMC", a nod to the Queens hip-hop group Run–D.M.C. On May 16, Carlos Beltrán recorded his 400th career home run. On May 29, the Yankees beat the Rays 2-1 with only one hit, a Starlin Castro 2-run home run, the first time the Yankees won with only hit since 1914.

June
June saw similar results to May, as the Yankees finished with one less win for the month than they achieved in May. The Yankees swept the Angels in a four-game home series and took three of four from a road series with the Twins; however, struggles against the Colorado Rockies and Texas Rangers killed the Yankees' momentum. The Yankees finished June with an impressive home record of 10-6, which was neutralized by an ineffective 5-6 record on the road. The Yankees went 15-12 in the month of June.

On June 17, Alex Rodriguez achieved his 3100th hit. On June 22, Starlin Castro hit a walk-off homer against the Rockies.

July
The Yankees finished July with 13 wins and 13 losses.  The Yankees sent three players to the 2016 Major League Baseball All-Star Game: Dellin Betances, Andrew Miller,  and Carlos Beltran. Mark Teixeira recorded his 400th career home run away against the San Diego Padres on July 3, becoming just the fifth switch hitter to do so in Major League history. Carlos Beltrán recorded his 1500th career run batted in on July 16.

The Yankees became sellers towards the trade deadline, cutting a massive amount of salary shipping away various players. The Yankees dealt closer Aroldis Chapman to the Chicago Cubs in return for shortstop prospect Gleyber Torres, minor league outfielders Rashad Crawford and Billy McKinney, as well as right-handed pitcher Adam Warren who previously played for the Yankees the season before. The Yankees traded lefty pitcher Andrew Miller to the Cleveland Indians for minor league outfielder Clint Frazier, minor league left-handed pitcher Justus Sheffield, and minor league right-handed pitchers J. P. Feyereisen and Ben Heller. Pitcher Iván Nova was traded to the Pittsburgh Pirates for two players to be named later.  The Yankees also traded veteran outfielder Carlos Beltrán to the Texas Rangers for pitchers Dillon Tate, Erik Swanson, and Nick Green.

August 

In early August, both Mark Teixeira and Alex Rodriguez announced their retirement from the team.  Mark Teixeira announced on August 5 that he would retire following the conclusion of the season.  Alex Rodriguez days later announced he would play his final game Friday, August 12, four homers short of 700.  Rodriguez would become a titular assistant to the team following his final game. The Yankees acquired Blake Parker in early August as well. The day after Rodriguez's release by the organization, Tyler Austin and Aaron Judge were called up and made their major-league debuts, hitting back-to-back homers in their first big league at-bats.  According to Elias Sports Bureau, Austin and Judge became the first teammates to go back-to-back in their first-ever at-bats in MLB history.
 Young Yankees catcher Gary Sánchez became the fastest player to record 11 home runs, accomplishing so in just twenty-three days. The Yankees finished the month of August with a 17–10 record.

September and October 
The Yankees started September off on a hot start. After dropping the first two games of the month, they won seven straight games. Afterward, however, they lost 11 of their next 15, including a 3–8 road trip where they were swept in a four-game series versus the Boston Red Sox at Fenway Park for the first time since 1990 and losing three of four to the Blue Jays in Toronto. They closed the season with a six-game homestead where they swept the Red Sox (in the second game, Mark Teixeira hit a walk-off grand slam in the bottom of the ninth, his last home run of his career, to lift the Yankees to a 5–3 win) and losing two of three to the Orioles. On September 27, Gary Sánchez tied a major league record for the fastest player to reach 20 career home runs when he went deep in only his 51st career game. The Yankees would be eliminated from playoff contention on September 29, after the Orioles defeated the Blue Jays. This makes it the third time in 4 seasons the Yankees would miss the playoffs.

Game log

|- style="text-align:center; background:#bbb;"
| 0 || Apr 4 || Astros ||colspan="8" | Postponed (rain). Makeup date: April 5.
|- align="center" bgcolor="ffbbbb"
| 1 || Apr 5 || Astros || 3–5 || Keuchel (1–0) || Betances (0–1) || Gregerson (1) || Yankee Stadium || 47,820 || 0–1
|- align="center" bgcolor="bbffbb"
| 2 || Apr 6 || Astros || 16–6 || Pineda (1–0) || McHugh (0–1) || Nova (1) || Yankee Stadium || 37,493 || 1–1
|- align="center" bgcolor="bbffbb"
| 3 || Apr 7 || Astros || 8–5 || Shreve (1–0) || Harris (0–1) || Miller (1) || Yankee Stadium || 30,003 || 2–1
|- align="center" bgcolor="ffbbbb"
| 4 || Apr 8 || @ Tigers || 0–4 || Zimmermann (1–0) || Severino (0–1) || – || Comerica Park || 45,049 || 2–2
|- align="center" bgcolor="bbffbb"
| 5 || Apr 9 || @ Tigers || 8–4 || Sabathia (1–0) || Pelfrey (0–1) || – || Comerica Park || 32,419 || 3–2
|- align="center" bgcolor="bbbbbb"
| — || Apr 10 || @ Tigers ||colspan="8" | Postponed (rain). Makeup date: June 2.
|- align="center" bgcolor="bbffbb"
| 6 || Apr 12 || @ Blue Jays || 3–2 || Barbato (1–0) || Cecil (0–1) || Miller (2) || Rogers Centre || 28,819 || 4–2
|- align="center" bgcolor="ffbbbb"
| 7 || Apr 13 || @ Blue Jays || 2–7 || Happ (1–0) || Pineda (1–1) || – || Rogers Centre || 27,938 || 4–3
|- align="center" bgcolor="ffbbbb"
| 8 || Apr 14 || @ Blue Jays || 2–4 || Stroman (2–0) || Eovaldi (0–1) || Osuna (4) || Rogers Centre || 36,238 || 4–4
|- align="center" bgcolor="ffbbbb"
| 9 || Apr 15 || Mariners || 1–7 || Karns (1–1) || Severino (0–2) || – || Yankee Stadium || 35,531 || 4–5
|- align="center" bgcolor="ffbbbb"
| 10 || Apr 16 || Mariners || 2–3 || Hernández (1–1) || Sabathia (1–1) || Cishek (1) || Yankee Stadium || 38,574 || 4–6
|- align="center" bgcolor="bbffbb"
| 11 || Apr 17 || Mariners || 4–3 || Tanaka (1–0) || Iwakuma (0–2) || Miller (3) || Yankee Stadium || 43,856 || 5–6
|- align="center" bgcolor="ffbbbb"
| 12 || Apr 19 || Athletics || 2–3 (11) || Rodriguez (1–0) || Barbato (1–1) || Madson (5) || Yankee Stadium || 31,952 || 5–7
|- align="center" bgcolor="ffbbbb"
| 13 || Apr 20 || Athletics || 2–5 || Graveman (1–1) || Eovaldi (0–2) || Doolittle (2) || Yankee Stadium || 37,396 || 5–8
|- align="center" bgcolor="ffbbbb"
| 14 || Apr 21 || Athletics || 3–7 || Hill (2–2) || Shreve (1–1) || Madson (6) || Yankee Stadium || 33,818 || 5–9
|- align="center" bgcolor="bbffbb"
| 15 || Apr 22 || Rays || 6–3 || Nova (1–0) || Moore (1–1) || Miller (4) || Yankee Stadium || 31,843 || 6–9
|- align="center" bgcolor="bbffbb"
| 16 || Apr 23 || Rays || 3–2 || Miller (1–0) || Ramírez (4–1)|| – || Yankee Stadium || 40,714 || 7–9
|- align="center" bgcolor="ffbbbb"
| 17 || Apr 24 || Rays || 1–8 || Smyly (1–2) || Pineda (1–2) || – || Yankee Stadium || 40,981 || 7–10
|- align="center" bgcolor="bbffbb"
| 18 || Apr 25 || @ Rangers || 3–1 || Eovaldi (1–2) || Ramos (0–1) || Miller (5) || Globe Life Park || 31,453 || 8–10
|- align="center" bgcolor="ffbbbb"
| 19|| Apr 26 || @ Rangers || 1–10 || Griffin (3–0) || Severino (0–3) || – || Globe Life Park || 26,163 || 8–11
|- align="center" bgcolor="ffbbbb"
| 20 || Apr 27 || @ Rangers || 2–3 || Pérez (1–2) || Sabathia (1–2) || Tolleson (7) || Globe Life Park || 35,477 || 8–12
|- align="center" bgcolor="ffbbbb"
| 21 || Apr 29 || @ Red Sox || 2–4 || Uehara (1–1) || Betances (0–2) || Kimbrel (7) || Fenway Park || 37,115 || 8–13
|- align="center" bgcolor="ffbbbb"
| 22 || Apr 30 || @ Red Sox || 0–8 || Porcello (5–0) || Pineda (1–3) || – || Fenway Park || 37,901 || 8–14
|-

|- align="center" bgcolor="ffbbbb"
| 23 || May 1 || @ Red Sox || 7–8 || Price (4–0) || Nova (1–1) || Kimbrel (8) || Fenway Park || 34,279 || 8–15
|- align="center" bgcolor="ffbbbb"
| 24 || May 3 || @ Orioles || 1–4 || Tillman (3–1) || Severino (0–4) || O'Day (2) || Oriole Park || 16,083 || 8–16
|- align="center" bgcolor="bbffbb"
| 25 || May 4 || @ Orioles || 7–0 || Sabathia (2–2) || Wilson (1–1) || – || Oriole Park || 15,998 || 9–16
|- align="center" bgcolor="ffbbbb"
| 26 || May 5 || @ Orioles || 0–1 (10) || Britton (2–1) || Barbato (1–2) || – || Oriole Park || 19,598 || 9–17
|- align="center" bgcolor="bbffbb"
| 27 || May 6 || Red Sox || 3–2 || Yates (1–0) || Porcello (5–1) || Miller (6) || Yankee Stadium || 45,756 || 10–17
|- align="center" bgcolor="bbffbb"
| 28 || May 7 || Red Sox || 8–2 || Eovaldi (2–2) || Price (4–1) || – || Yankee Stadium || 47,822 || 11–17
|- align="center" bgcolor="ffbbbb"
| 29 || May 8 || Red Sox || 1–5 || Wright (3–3) || Severino (0–5) || – || Yankee Stadium || 41,869 || 11–18
|- align="center" bgcolor="bbffbb"
| 30 || May 9 || Royals || 6–3 || Yates (2–0) || Young (1–5) || – || Yankee Stadium || 41,243 || 12–18
|- align="center" bgcolor="bbffbb"
| 31 || May 10 || Royals || 10–7 || Miller (2–0) || Herrera (0–1) || Chapman (1) || Yankee Stadium || 39,128 || 13–18
|- align="center" bgcolor="ffbbbb"
| 32 || May 11 || Royals || 3–7 || Ventura (3–2) || Pineda (1–4) || – || Yankee Stadium || 31,226 || 13–19
|- align="center" bgcolor="bbffbb"
| 33 || May 12 || Royals || 7–3 || Eovaldi (3–2) || Kennedy (4–3) || – || Yankee Stadium || 35,944 || 14–19
|- align="center" bgcolor="ffbbbb"
| 34 || May 13 || White Sox || 1–7 || Sale (8–0)|| Severino (0–6) || – || Yankee Stadium || 34,264 || 14–20
|- align="center" bgcolor="bbffbb"
| 35 || May 14 || White Sox || 2–1 || Nova (2–1) || Quintana (5–2) || Chapman (2) || Yankee Stadium || 39,691 || 15–20
|- align="center" bgcolor="bbffbb"
| 36 || May 15 || White Sox || 7–5 || Betances (1–2) || Albers (1–2) || Chapman (3) || Yankee Stadium || 41,979 || 16–20
|- align="center" bgcolor="ffbbbb"
| 37 || May 16 || @ D'backs || 2–12 || Ray (2–2) || Green (0–1) || – || Chase Field || 32,718 || 16–21
|- align="center" bgcolor="ffbbbb"
| 38 || May 17 || @ D'backs || 3–5 || Greinke (4–3) || Pineda (1–5) || Ziegler (8) || Chase Field || 30,913 || 16–22
|- align="center" bgcolor="bbffbb"
| 39 || May 18 || @ D'backs || 4–2 || Eovaldi (4–2) || Miller (1–5) || Chapman (4) || Chase Field || 32,191 || 17–22
|- align="center" bgcolor="bbffbb"
| 40 || May 19 || @ Athletics || 4–1 || Nova (3–1) || Graveman (1–6) || Chapman (5) || Oakland Alameda Coliseum || 17,456 || 18–22
|- align="center" bgcolor="bbffbb"
| 41 || May 20 || @ Athletics || 8–3 || Sabathia (3–2) || Gray (3–5) || – || Oakland Alameda Coliseum || 28,235 || 19–22
|- align="center" bgcolor="bbffbb"
| 42 || May 21 || @ Athletics || 5–1 || Tanaka (2–0)   || Manaea (1–2) || – || Oakland Alameda Coliseum || 26,356 || 20–22
|- align="center" bgcolor="bbffbb"
| 43 || May 22 || @ Athletics || 5–4 || Pineda (2–5) || Hahn (1–2) || Chapman (6) || Oakland Alameda Coliseum || 25,237 || 21–22
|- align="center" bgcolor="bbffbb"
| 44 || May 24 || Blue Jays || 6–0 || Eovaldi (5–2) || Dickey  (2–6) || – || Yankee Stadium || 35,174 || 22–22
|- align="center" bgcolor="ffbbbb"
| 45 || May 25 || Blue Jays || 4–8 || Estrada (2–2) || Nova (3–2) || – || Yankee Stadium || 38,959 || 22–23
|- align="center" bgcolor="ffbbbb"
| 46 || May 26 || Blue Jays || 1–3 || Happ (6–2) || Sabathia (3–3) || Osuna (10) || Yankee Stadium || 38,391 || 22–24
|- align="center" bgcolor="bbffbb"
| 47 || May 27 || @ Rays || 4–1 || Tanaka (3–0) || Archer (3–6) || – || Tropicana Field || 14,697 || 23–24 
|- align="center" bgcolor="ffbbbb"
| 48 || May 28 || @ Rays || 5–9 || Moore (2–3) || Pineda (2–6) || – || Tropicana Field || 20,188 || 23–25 
|- align="center" bgcolor="bbffbb"
| 49 || May 29 || @ Rays || 2–1 || Eovaldi (6–2) ||Odorizzi (2–3) || Chapman (7) || Tropicana Field || 19,748 || 24–25
|- align="center" bgcolor="ffbbbb"
|  50 || May 30 || @ Blue Jays || 2–4 ||Estrada (3–2) ||Nova (3–3) || Storen (3) || Rogers Centre || 32,921|| 24–26
|- align="center" bgcolor="ffbbbb"
| 51 || May 31 || @ Blue Jays || 1–4 || Biagini (3–1) ||Sabathia (3–4) || Osuna (12)|| Rogers Centre || 33,419 || 24–27
|-

|- align="center" bgcolor="ffbbbb"
| 52 || Jun 1 || @ Blue Jays || 0–7 || Sanchez (5–1) ||  Tanaka (3–1) || – || Rogers Centre || 39,512 || 24–28 
|- align="center" bgcolor="bbffbb"
|  53 || Jun 2 || @ Tigers || 5–4 || Betances (2–2) || Boyd (0–1)  ||  Chapman (8) || Comerica Park || 28,213 || 25–28
|- align="center" bgcolor="ffbbbb"
|  54 || Jun 3 || @ Orioles || 5–6 || Givens (5–0)||Betances (2–3) || Britton (16) || Oriole Park || 25,220|| 25–29
|- align="center" bgcolor="bbffbb"
|  55 || Jun 4 || @ Orioles || 8–6 || Nova (4–3) || Wilson (2–5)|| Chapman (9) || Oriole Park || 33,170|| 26–29
|- align="center" bgcolor="ffbbbb"
| 56|| Jun 5 || @ Orioles || 1–3 || McFarland  (1–1)||Betances (2–4) || Britton (17) || Oriole Park || 28,807 || 26–30
|- align="center" bgcolor="bbffbb"
| 57 || Jun 6 || Angels || 5–2 || Miller (3–0) || Shoemaker (3–7) || Chapman (10)  || Yankee Stadium || 34,648 || 27–30
|- align="center" bgcolor="bbffbb"
|  58 || Jun 7 || Angels || 6–3 || Pineda (3–6) || Huff (0–1) || Miller (7)|| Yankee Stadium || 31,034 || 28–30
|- align="center" bgcolor="bbffbb"
|  59 || Jun 8 || Angels || 12–6 || Swarzak (1–0) || Weaver (5–5) || – || Yankee Stadium || 31,557 || 29–30
|- align="center" bgcolor="bbffbb"
|   60 || Jun 9 || Angels || 6–3 || Nova (5–3) ||Chacín (2–4) || Chapman (11) || Yankee Stadium || 31,560|| 30–30 
|- align="center" bgcolor="bbffbb"
|  61 || Jun 10 || Tigers || 4–0 || Sabathia (4–4) || Pelfrey (1–6) || – || Yankee Stadium || 40,011 ||31–30  
|- align="center" bgcolor="ffbbbb"
| 62 || Jun 11 || Tigers || 1–4 || Verlander (5–4) ||Tanaka (3–2) ||Rodríguez (18) || Yankee Stadium || 38,050 || 31–31
|- align="center" bgcolor="ffbbbb"
| 63 || Jun 12 || Tigers || 1–4 || Fulmer (7–1) || Pineda (3–7) || Rodríguez (19) || Yankee Stadium || 47,474 || 31–32
|- align="center" bgcolor="ffbbbb"
| 64 || Jun 14 || @ Rockies || 10–13 || de la Rosa (3–4) ||Eovaldi (6–3) || Estévez (2) || Coors Field || 46,335 || 31–33 
|- align="center" bgcolor="ffbbbb"
| 65 || Jun 15 || @ Rockies || 3–6 || Bettis (5–5) || Nova (5–4) || Estévez (3) || Coors Field || 40,093 || 31–34 
|- align="center" bgcolor="bbffbb"
| 66 || Jun 16 || @ Twins || 4–1 || Sabathia (5–4) || Gibson (0–5) || Chapman (12) || Target Field ||  23,751 || 32–34 
|- align="center" bgcolor="bbffbb"
| 67 || Jun 17 || @ Twins || 8–2 || Tanaka (3–2) || Dean (1–3) || – || Target Field || 23,888 || 33–34
|- align="center" bgcolor="bbffbb"
| 68 || Jun 18 || @ Twins || 7–6 || Miller (4–0) || Abad (1–1) || Chapman (13) || Target Field || 34,368 || 34–34
|- align="center" bgcolor="ffbbbb"
| 69 || Jun 19 || @ Twins || 4–7 || Santana (2–7) || Eovaldi (6–4) || Kintzler (2) || Target Field || 29,553 || 34–35 
|- align="center" bgcolor="ffbbbb"
| 70 || Jun 21 || Rockies || 4–8 || Bettis (6–5) || Nova (5–5)|| –  || Yankee Stadium || 34,760 || 34–36
|- align="center" bgcolor="bbffbb"
|  71|| Jun 22 || Rockies || 9–8 || Chapman (1–0)|| Motte (0–1) || –  || Yankee Stadium || 40,104|| 35–36
|- align="center" bgcolor="bbffbb"
| 72 || Jun 24 || Twins || 5–3 || Tanaka (5–2) || Milone (0–2) || Chapman (14) || Yankee Stadium || 36,090 || 36–36 
|- align="center" bgcolor="bbffbb"
| 73 || Jun 25 || Twins || 2–1 || Miller (5–0) || Pressly (2–4) || Chapman (15) || Yankee Stadium || 40,075 || 37–36 
|- align="center" bgcolor="ffbbbb"
| 74 || Jun 26 || Twins || 1–7 || Duffey (3–6) || Eovaldi (6–5) || － || Yankee Stadium || 38,673 || 37–37
|- align="center" bgcolor="ffbbbb"
| 75 || Jun 27 || Rangers || 6–9 || Barnette (5–2) || Yates (2–1)|| Dyson (16) || Yankee Stadium || 32,914 || 37–38
|- align="center" bgcolor="ffbbbb"
| 76 || Jun 28 || Rangers || 1–7 || Hamels (9–1) ||  Sabathia (5–5) || – || Yankee Stadium || 32,373 || 37–39
|- align="center" bgcolor="bbffbb"
| 77 || Jun 29 || Rangers || 9–7 || Cessa (1–0) || Dyson (1–2) || – || Yankee Stadium || 39,875 || 38–39
|- align="center" bgcolor="bbffbb"
| 78 || Jun 30 || Rangers || 2–1 || Chapman (2–0) || Barnette (5–3) || – || Yankee Stadium || 39,934 || 39–39
|-

|- align="center" bgcolor="ffbbbb"
| 79 || Jul 1 || @ Padres || 6–7 || Rea (5–3) || Eovaldi (6–6) || Maurer (1) || Petco Park ||41,321 || 39–40
|- align="center" bgcolor="ffbbbb"
|  80 || Jul 2 || @ Padres || 1–2 || Hand (2–2)|| Miller (5–1) || – || Petco Park || 42,315 || 39–41
|- align="center" bgcolor="bbffbb"
| 81 || Jul 3 || @ Padres || 6–3 || Green (1–1)|| Cashner (3–6) || Chapman (16) || Petco Park || 42,131 || 40–41 
|- align="center" bgcolor="ffbbbb"
| 82 || Jul 4 || @ White Sox || 2–8 || Shields (4–9)|| Sabathia (5–6)|| – || U.S. Cellular Field ||30,905 ||40–42
|- align="center" bgcolor="bbffbb"
| 83 || Jul 5 || @ White Sox || 9–0 || Tanaka (6–2)|| Rodon (2–8) || – || U.S. Cellular Field || 20,773|| 41–42
|- align="center" bgcolor="ffbbbb"
| 84 || Jul 6 || @ White Sox || 0–5 ||González (2–4) || Pineda (3–8) || – || U.S. Cellular Field || 21,144|| 41–43
|- align="center" bgcolor="bbffbb"
| 85 || Jul 7 || @ Indians || 5–4 || Nova (6–5) || Bauer (7–3) || Chapman (17) || Progressive Field || 23,848 || 42–43 
|- align="center" bgcolor="ffbbbb"
| 86 || Jul 8 || @ Indians || 2–10 || Green (1–2) || Kluber (9–8) || – || Progressive Field || 34,045 || 42–44
|- align="center" bgcolor="bbffbb"
| 87 || Jul 9 || @ Indians || 7–6 (11) ||Chapman (3–0) || Hunter (2–2) || – || Progressive Field ||32,951 || 43–44 
|- align="center" bgcolor="bbffbb"
| 88 || Jul 10 || @ Indians || 11–7 ||  Eovaldi (7–6) || Carrasco (5–3)|| – || Progressive Field || 29,089 || 44–44
|- style="text-align:center; background:#bbcaff;"
| colspan="10" | 87th All-Star Game in San Diego, California
|- align="center" bgcolor="ffbbbb"
| 89 || Jul 15 || Red Sox || 3–5 || Wright (11–5) || Pineda (3–9) || Uehara (5) || Yankee Stadium || 47,439 || 44–45 
|- align="center" bgcolor="ffbbbb"
| 90 || Jul 16 || Red Sox || 2–5 || Rodríguez (2–3) || Sabathia (5–7) || Uehara (6) || Yankee Stadium || 48,329 || 44–46 
|- align="center" bgcolor="bbffbb"
| 91 || Jul 17 || Red Sox || 3–1 || Tanaka (7–2) || Price (9–7) || Chapman (18) || Yankee Stadium || 42,884 || 45–46 
|- align="center" bgcolor="bbffbb"
| 92 || Jul 18 || Orioles || 2–1 || Nova (7–5) || Gausman (1–7) || Chapman (19) || Yankee Stadium || 31,102 || 46–46
|- align="center" bgcolor="bbffbb"
| 93 || Jul 19 || Orioles || 7–1 || Eovaldi (8–6) || Worley (2–1) || – || Yankee Stadium || 31,192 || 47–46
|- align="center" bgcolor="bbffbb"
| 94 || Jul 20 || Orioles || 5–0 || Pineda (4–9) || Gallardo (3–2) || – || Yankee Stadium || 35,681 || 48–46
|- align="center" bgcolor="ffbbbb"
| 95 || Jul 21 || Orioles || 1–4 || Tillman (14–2) || Sabathia (5–8) || Britton (30) || Yankee Stadium || 42,476 || 48–47 
|- align="center" bgcolor="bbffbb"
| 96 || Jul 22 || Giants || 3–2 || Miller  (6–1) || Osich (1–2) || Chapman (20) || Yankee Stadium ||45,304 || 49–47
|- align="center" bgcolor="ffbbbb"
| 97 || Jul 23 || Giants || 1–2 (12) || Casilla (2–3) || Swarzak (1–1) || Strickland (2) || Yankee Stadium || 46,727 || 49–48 
|- align="center" bgcolor="bbffbb"
| 98 || Jul 24 || Giants || 5–2 || Eovaldi (9–6) || Samardzija (9–6) || Green (1) || Yankee Stadium || 34,143 || 50–48
|- align="center" bgcolor="bbffbb"
| 99 || Jul 25 || @ Astros || 2–1 || Pineda (5–9) || Keuchel (6–10) || Miller (8) || Minute Maid Park || 30,628 || 51–48 
|- align="center" bgcolor="bbffbb"
| 100 || Jul 26 || @ Astros || 6–3 || Sabathia (6–8) || Fister (10–7) || Miller (9) || Minute Maid Park || 28,134 || 52–48 
|- align="center" bgcolor="ffbbbb"
| 101 || Jul 27 || @ Astros || 1–4 || McCullers (6–4) || Tanaka (7–3) || Harris (11) || Minute Maid Park || 35,186 || 52–49
|- align="center" bgcolor="ffbbbb"
| 102 || Jul 29 || @ Rays || 1–5 || Odorizzi (5–5) || Nova (7–6) || Colomé (23) || Tropicana Field || 17,856 || 52–50 
|- align="center" bgcolor="ffbbbb"
| 103 || Jul 30 || @ Rays || 3–6 || Smyly (3–11) || Eovaldi (9–7) || Colomé (24)|| Tropicana Field || 45,883 || 52–51
|- align="center" bgcolor="ffbbbb"
| 104 || Jul 31 || @ Rays || 3–5 || Snell (3–5) || Pineda (5–10) || Colomé (25)  || Tropicana Field || 18,109 || 52–52
|-

|- align="center" bgcolor="bbffbb"
| 105 || Aug 1 || @ Mets || 6–5 (10) || Warren (4–2) || Lugo (0–1) || Betances (1) || Citi Field || 42,125 || 53–52 
|- align="center" bgcolor="ffbbbb"
| 106 || Aug 2 || @ Mets || 1–7 || deGrom (7–5) || Tanaka (7–4) || –|| Citi Field || 42,819 || 53–53 
|- align="center" bgcolor="bbffbb"
| 107 || Aug 3 || Mets || 9–5 || Severino (1–6) || Matz (8–8) || – || Yankee Stadium || 48,339 || 54–53 
|- align="center" bgcolor="ffbbbb"
| 108 || Aug 4 || Mets || 1–4 || Colón (10–6) || Eovaldi (9–8) || Familia (38) || Yankee Stadium || 48,153 || 54–54 
|- align="center" bgcolor="bbffbb"
| 109 || Aug 5 || Indians || 13–7 || Pineda (6–10) || Tomlin (11–4) ||  － || Yankee Stadium || 39,252 || 55–54 
|- align="center" bgcolor="ffbbbb"
| 110 || Aug 6 || Indians ||  2–5 || Kluber (11–8) || Sabathia (6–9) || Miller (10) || Yankee Stadium || 37,264 || 55–55  
|- align="center" bgcolor="bbffbb"
| 111 || Aug 7 || Indians || 3–2 || Tanaka (8–4) || Carrasco (7–6) || Betances (2) || Yankee Stadium ||39,720 || 56–55 
|- align="center" bgcolor="ffbbbb"
| 112 || Aug 9 || @ Red Sox || 3–5 || Porcello (15–3) || Severino (1–7) || Barnes (1) || Fenway Park || 38,089 || 56–56 
|- align="center" bgcolor="bbffbb"
| 113 || Aug 10 || @ Red Sox || 9–4 || Clippard (3–3) || Abad (1–6) || – || Fenway Park || 37,779 || 57–56 
|- align="center" bgcolor="bbffbb"
| 114 || Aug 11 || @ Red Sox ||4–2 || Cessa (2–0) || Ziegler (2-6) || Betances (3) || Fenway Park || 38,161|| 58–56 
|- align="center" bgcolor="bbffbb"
| 115|| Aug 12 || Rays || 6–3 || Sabathia (7–9)|| Archer (6–16) || Betances (4) || Yankee Stadium || 46,459 || 59–56
|- align="center" bgcolor="bbffbb"
| 116 || Aug 13 ||Rays || 8–4 || Tanaka  (9–4)|| Andries (6–4)|| – || Yankee Stadium || 41,682 ||60–56
|- align="center" bgcolor="ffbbbb"
| 117 || Aug 14 || Rays || 3–12 || Odorizzi (7–5) || Severino (1–8) || – || Yankee Stadium || 41,473 || 60–57 
|- align="center" bgcolor="bbffbb"
| 118 || Aug 15 || Blue Jays || 1–0 || Green (2-2) || Dickey (8-13)|| Betances (5) || Yankee Stadium || 36,015 || 61–57 
|- align="center" bgcolor="ffbbbb"
| 119 || Aug 16 || Blue Jays || 6–12 || Feldman (6–4) || Warren (4–3) || – ||  Yankee Stadium || 31,874 || 61–58
|- align="center" bgcolor="ffbbbb"
| 120 || Aug 17 || Blue Jays || 4–7 || Happ (17–3) || Sabathia (7–10) || Osuna (27) || Yankee Stadium || 37,736 || 61–59
|- align="center" bgcolor="bbffbb"
| 121 || Aug 19 || @ Angels || 7–0 || Tanaka (10–4) || Weaver (8–11) || – || Angel Stadium of Anaheim || 40,256 || 62–59 
|- align="center" bgcolor="bbffbb"
| 122 || Aug 20 || @ Angels || 5–1 || Cessa (3–0) || Nolasco (4–11) || – || Angel Stadium of Anaheim || 44,129 || 63–59 
|- align="center" bgcolor="ffbbbb"
| 123 || Aug 21 || @ Angels || 0–2 || Chacin (4–8) || Green (2–3) || Salas (4) || Angel Stadium of Anaheim || 40,309 || 63–60 
|- align="center" bgcolor="ffbbbb"
| 124 || Aug 22 || @ Mariners || 5–7 || Vincent (3–3) || Swarzak (1–2) || Díaz (10) || Safeco Field || 24,384 || 63–61 
|- align="center" bgcolor="bbffbb"
| 125 || Aug 23 || @ Mariners || 5–1 || Sabathia (8–10) || Walker (4–8) || — || Safeco Field || 24,628 || 64–61 
|- align="center" bgcolor="bbffbb"
| 126 || Aug 24 || @ Mariners || 5–0 || Tanaka (11–4) || Iwakuma (14–9) || — || Safeco Field || 41,536 || 65–61 
|- align="center" bgcolor="bbffbb"
| 127 || Aug 26 || Orioles || 14–4 || Cessa (4–0) || Gallardo (4–6) || — || Yankee Stadium || 38,423 || 66–61 
|- align="center" bgcolor="bbffbb"
| 128 || Aug 27 || Orioles || 13–5 || Layne (1–1) || Bundy (7–5) || — || Yankee Stadium || 38,843 || 67–61 
|- align="center" bgcolor="ffbbbb"
| 129 || Aug 28 || Orioles || 0–5 || Gausman (6–10) || Sabathia (8–11)|| || Yankee Stadium || 38,002 || 67–62 
|- align="center" bgcolor="ffbbbb"
| 130 || Aug 29 || @ Royals || 5–8 || Gee (6–7) || Pineda (6–11) || Herrera (11) || Kauffman Stadium || 22,859 || 67–63 
|- align="center" bgcolor="bbffbb"
| 131 || Aug 30 || @ Royals || 5–4 (10) || Betances (3–4) || Soria (4–6) || Shreve (1) || Kauffman Stadium || 22,895 || 68–63 
|- align="center" bgcolor="bbffbb"
| 132 || Aug 31 || @ Royals || 5–4 (13) || Heller (1–0) || Young (3–9) || Betances (7) || Kauffman Stadium || 22,615 || 69–63 
|-

|- align="center" bgcolor="#ffbbbb"
| 133 || Sep 2 || @ Orioles || 0–8 || Bundy (8–5) || Green (2–4) || — || Oriole Park || 24,226 || 69–64 
|- align="center" bgcolor="#ffbbbb"
| 134 || Sep 3 || @ Orioles || 0–2 || Gausman (7–10) || Sabathia (8–12) || Britton (40) || Oriole Park || 30,855 || 69–65 
|- align="center" bgcolor="bbffbb"
| 135 || Sep 4 || @ Orioles || 5–2 || Severino (2–8) || Miley (8–12) || Betances (8) || Oriole Park || 31,161 || 70–65 
|- align="center" bgcolor="bbffbb"
| 136 || Sep 5 || Blue Jays || 5–3 || Tanaka (12–4) || Dickey (9–14) || Betances (9) || Yankee Stadium || 42,141 || 71–65 
|- align="center" bgcolor="bbffbb"
| 137 || Sep 6 || Blue Jays || 7–6 || Shreve (2–1) || Grilli (5–5) || Parker (1) || Yankee Stadium || 27,532 || 72–65 
|- align="center" bgcolor="bbffbb"
| 138 || Sep 7 || Blue Jays || 2–0 || Mitchell (1–0) || Stroman (9–7) || Clippard (2) || Yankee Stadium || 30,501 || 73–65 
|- align="center" bgcolor="bbffbb"
| 139 || Sep 8 || Rays || 5–4 || Layne (2–1) || Ramírez (7–11) || – || Yankee Stadium || 27,631 || 74–65 
|- align="center" bgcolor="bbffbb"
| 140 || Sep 9 || Rays || 7–5 || Warren (5–3) || Snell (5–8) || Betances (10) || Yankee Stadium || 30,194 || 75–65 
|- align="center" bgcolor="bbffbb"
| 141 || Sep 10 || Rays || 5–1 || Tanaka (13–4) || Archer (8–18) || — || Yankee Stadium || 35,810 || 76–65 
|- align="center" bgcolor="ffbbbb"
| 142 || Sep 11 || Rays || 2–4 || Andriese (7–7) || Cessa (4–1) || Colomé (32) || Yankee Stadium || 33,087 || 76–66 
|- align="center" bgcolor="ffbbbb"
| 143 || Sep 12 || Dodgers || 2–8 || De León (2–0) || Mitchell (1–1) || — || Yankee Stadium || 32,058 || 76–67 
|- align="center" bgcolor="bbffbb"
| 144 || Sep 13 || Dodgers || 3–0 || Warren (3–1) || Stripling (4–7) || Betances (11) || Yankee Stadium || 32,615 || 77–67 
|- align="center" bgcolor="ffbbbb"
| 145 || Sep 14 || Dodgers || 0–2 || Avilán (2–0) || Betances (3–5) || Jansen (44) || Yankee Stadium || 30,254 || 77–68 
|- align="center" bgcolor="ffbbbb"
| 146 || Sep 15 || @ Red Sox || 5–7 || Kelly (3–0) || Betances (3–6) || — || Fenway Park || 37,768 || 77–69 
|- align="center" bgcolor="ffbbbb"
| 147 || Sep 16 || @ Red Sox || 4–7 || Buchholz (7–10) || Cessa (4–2) || Kimbrel (26) || Fenway Park || 37,927 || 77–70 
|- align="center" bgcolor="ffbbbb"
| 148 || Sep 17 || @ Red Sox || 5–6 || Barnes (4–3) || Warren (6–4) || Kimbrel (27) || Fenway Park || 37,267 || 77–71 
|- align="center" bgcolor="ffbbbb"
| 149 || Sep 18 || @ Red Sox || 4–5 || Scott (1–0) || Clippard (3–4) || Uehara (7) || Fenway Park || 37,306 || 77–72 
|- align="center" bgcolor="bbffbb"
| 150|| Sep 20 || @ Rays || 5–3 || Severino (3–8) || Boxberger (4–3) || Betances (12) || Tropicana Field || 12,732 || 78–72 
|- align="center" bgcolor="bbffbb"
| 151 || Sep 21 || @ Rays || 11–5 || Tanaka (14–4) || Cobb (1–1) || – || Tropicana Field || 12,192 || 79–72 
|- align="center" bgcolor="ffbbbb"
| 152 || Sep 22 || @ Rays || 0–2 || Snell (6–8) || Cessa (4–3) ||  Colomé (35) || Tropicana Field || 13,355 || 79–73 
|- align="center" bgcolor="ffbbbb"
| 153 || Sep 23 || @ Blue Jays || 0–9 || Liriano (8–13) || Mitchell (1–2) || – || Rogers Centre || 47,016 || 79–74 
|- align="center" bgcolor="ffbbbb"
| 154 || Sep 24 || @ Blue Jays || 0–3 || Grilli (7–5) || Clippard (3–5) || Osuna (35) || Rogers Centre || 47,828 || 79–75 
|- align="center" bgcolor="ffbbbb"
| 155 || Sep 25 || @ Blue Jays || 3–4 || Osuna (3–2) || Clippard (3–6) || – || Rogers Centre || 47,896 || 79–76 
|- align="center" bgcolor="bbffbb"
| 156 || Sep 26 || @ Blue Jays || 7–5 || Warren (7–4) || Grilli (7–6) || Layne (1) || Rogers Centre || 44,532 || 80–76 
|- align="center" bgcolor="bbffbb"
| 157 || Sep 27 || Red Sox || 6–4 || Parker (1–0) || Price (17–9) || Clippard (3) || Yankee Stadium || 35,161 || 81–76 
|- align="center" bgcolor="bbffbb"
| 158 || Sep 28 || Red Sox || 5–3 || Pazos (1–0) || Kimbrel (2–5) || – || Yankee Stadium || 35,520 || 82–76 
|- align="center" bgcolor="bbffbb"
| 159 || Sep 29 || Red Sox || 5–1 || Sabathia (9–12) || Owens (0–2) || – || Yankee Stadium || 41,597 || 83–76 
|- align="center" bgcolor="ffbbbb"
| 160 || Sep 30 || Orioles || 1–8 || Gallardo (6–8) || Pineda (6–12) || – || Yankee Stadium || 33,955 || 83–77 
|-

|- align="center" bgcolor="bbffbb"
| 161 || Oct 1 || Orioles || 7–3 ||Clippard (4–6)|| Brach (10–4) || — || Yankee Stadium || 33,222
|| 84–77 
|- align="center" bgcolor="ffbbbb"
| 162 || Oct 2 || Orioles || 2–5 || Gausman (9–12) || Cessa (4–4)|| — || Yankee Stadium ||33,277|| 84–78 
|-

Farm system

LEAGUE CHAMPIONS: Scranton/Wilkes-Barre

References

External links
2016 New York Yankees season
2016 New York Yankees season at Baseball Reference

New York Yankees seasons
New York Yankees
New York Yankees
2010s in the Bronx